Lipowe Pole Skarbowe  is a village in the administrative district of Gmina Skarżysko Kościelne, within Skarżysko County, Świętokrzyskie Voivodeship, in south-central Poland.

References

Lipowe Pole Skarbowe